Defense of the Karbala City Hall, also known as the Battle of the City Hall, was a series of fights that took place between 3 and 6 April 2004, between soldiers of Mahdi Army, attacking the city hall of Karbala, Iraq, and defending it Polish and Bulgarian soldiers of the Multinational Division Central-South, together with the several police officers of Iraqi Police. It ended with a Polish and Bulgarian victory, who did not suffer a single fatality, in contrast to the attacking group, who suffered around 80 - 90 deaths.

See also 
 Karbala (film)

Citations

Notes

References 

Battles of the Iraq War in 2004
Battles of the Iraq War involving Iraq
Battles of the Iraq War involving Poland
Battles involving Bulgaria
Defense of the Karbala City Hall
Defense of the Karbala City Hall